Rohama is a tehsil in the Baramulla District of Jammu and Kashmir, India. The tehsil headquarter is in  Rohama. It is located to the north of Baramulla, about 12 km from the district headquarters, and 70 km from the state capital Srinagar to the west. The 08 Rafiabad is  its assembly constituency.

Rohama is surrounded by Watergam tehsil, dangiwacha tehsil, Baramulla tehsil, and Sopore tehsil. Baramulla is the nearest city.

People of Rohama are mainly dependent on agriculture and horticulture. There are more than 100 government and private offices,Sub Divisional Agriculture office,Sub Treasury, an ,KGBV,Tehsil Supply office , assistant Registrar cooperative,Jio Sub office for Rafiabad and Qaziabad and a sub-district hospital. There are three public-sector bank branches in the town: the Jammu and Kashmir bank, State bank of India and J&K Grameen Bank.  Rohama is  a small valley surrounded by small mountain peaks. There are many tourist attractions, including Ladu Ladoora,Bosnian (famous potato farm), Viji Top, Gabwar, Khahmoha (helipad), Medicinal plant resource centre khahmoha, Saterwan and a famous gurudwara (Tapyana sahib Shalkote )where Sikhs from all over India visit.

.. being largest in  population.

Rohama

References 

Cities and towns in Baramulla district